Hermann Alexander Graf von Keyserling ( – 26 April 1946) was a Baltic German philosopher from the Keyserlingk family. His grandfather, Alexander von Keyserling, was a notable geologist of Imperial Russia.

Life
Keyserling was born to a wealthy aristocratic family in the Könno Manor, Kreis Pernau in Governorate of Livonia, Russian Empire, now in Estonia. After his education at the universities of Dorpat (Tartu), Heidelberg, and Vienna, he took a trip around the world. He married Maria Goedela von Bismarck-Schönhausen, granddaughter of Otto von Bismarck.  His son Arnold Keyserling followed his fathers footsteps and became a renowned philosopher.

Hermann Keyserling interested himself in natural science and in philosophy, and before World War I he was known both as a student of geology and as a popular essayist. The Russian Revolution deprived him of his estate in Livonia, and with the remains of his fortune he founded the Gesellschaft für Freie Philosophie (Society for Free Philosophy) at Darmstadt. The mission of this school was to bring about the intellectual reorientation of Germany.

He was the first to use the term Führerprinzip. One of Keyserling's central claims was that certain "gifted individuals" were "born to rule" on the basis of Social Darwinism.

Although not a doctrinaire pacifist, Keyserling believed that the old German policy of militarism was dead for all time and that Germany's only hope lay in the adoption of international, democratic principles. His best-known work is the Reisetagebuch eines Philosophen ("Travel-journal of a Philosopher"). The book also describes his travels in Asia, America and Southern Europe.

He died at Innsbruck, Austria.

Works

References

Further reading 
 Dyserinck, Hugo: Graf Hermann Keyserling und Frankreich, Ein Kapitel deutsch-französischer Geistesbeziehungen im 20. Jahrhundert; Bouvier, Bonn 1970; 
 Gahlings, Ute: Hermann Graf Keyserling, ein Lebensbild; Justus-von-Liebig-Verlag, Darmstadt 1996; 
 Keyserling-Archiv Innsbruck-Mühlau (Hrsg.): Graf Hermann Keyserling, ein Gedächtnisbuch; Rohrer, Innsbruck 1948
 Kaminsky, Amy: ' Victoria Ocampo and the Keyserling Effect' in Argentina, Stories for a Nation, (Minneapolis: University of Minnesota Press, 2008)  p. 70-98.

External links

 
 
Count Hermann Keyserling at www.schoolofwisdom.com
Schule der Weisheit at schuledesrades.org (German online Books)
THE WEBSITE OF Stammbaum der Grafen und Barone Keyserlingk at www.keyserlingk.info
 

1880 births
1946 deaths
People from Põhja-Pärnumaa Parish
People from Kreis Pernau
Baltic-German people
German philanthropists
German male writers
20th-century philanthropists
20th-century German philosophers